Prudential Bank Limited (PBL), commonly known as Prudential Bank, is a private commercial bank in Ghana. It is licensed by the Bank of Ghana, the central bank and national banking regulator.

Location
The headquarters of the bank is located at 8 John Hammond Street, Ring Road Central, Kanda, Accra, Ghana's capital and largest city. The coordinates of the bank's headquarters are 5°34'24.0"N, 0°11'31.0"W (Latitude:5.573335; Longitude:-0.191949).

Overview
The bank was incorporated in 1993, and opened on 15 August 1996 with the first branch in Accra.

PBL is a medium-sized bank specializing in meeting the banking needs of small and medium-sized businesses and individuals.

As of 31 December 2012, the bank's total assets were GHS:676.61 million, with shareholders' equity of GHS:85.1 million.

Subsidiaries
As of April 2016, PBL maintained three wholly owned subsidiaries:

 PBL Properties Limited - Accra, Ghana. Acquires, develops, and manages properties and auxiliary staff for the bank.
 Prudential Securities Limited - Accra, Ghana. Wealth management, corporate finance, and business advisory services.
 Prudential Stockbrokers Limited - Accra, Ghana. Stockbrokage, economic research, and advisory services.

Ownership
The bank's stock was owned by the following corporate entities and individuals as of 31 December 2012:

Branch network
As of June 2022, PBL had 43 branches and 2 agencies at the following locations:

 Abeka Branch - Accra
 Aboabo Branch - Kumasi
 Abossey Okai Branch - Accra
 Accra Branch - Accra
 Adenta Branch - Accra
 Afful Nkwanta Branch - Kumasi
 Atonsu Branch - Kumasi
 Cape Coast Branch - Cape Coast
 East Legon Branch - East Legon, Accra
 Gicel Branch - Accra
 Kumasi Adum Branch - Kumasi
 Kumasi Main Branch - Kumasi
 Kwame Nkrumah Circle Branch - Accra
 Madina Branch - Accra
 Makola Branch - Accra
 Mataheko Branch - Accra
 Methodist University Agency Branch - Accra
 North Industrial Area Branch - Accra
 Odorkor Branch - Accra
 Ring Road Central Branch - Accra
 Spintex Road Branch - Accra
 Suame Maakro Branch - Kumasi
 Takoradi Harbour Branch - Takoradi
 Takoradi Market Circle Branch - Takoradi
 Tamale Branch - Tamale
 Tema Community 1 Branch - Tema
 Tema Fishing Harbour Branch - Tema
 Tesano Branch - Accra
 University of Cape Coast Branch - Cape Coast
 Valley View Agency Branch - Accra
 Weija Branch - Accra
 Zongo Junction Branch - Accra

See also
 List of banks in Ghana
 Economy of Ghana

References

External links
Prudential Bank Limited Homepage
PBL launches "Susu" Financial Program for SME's
PBL opens new branch in Aboabo, Kumasi

Banks of Ghana
Companies based in Accra
Banks established in 1996
Ghanaian companies established in 1996